Eye of the Hurricane or Eye of a Hurricane may refer to:

 Eye (hurricane), the region of mostly calm weather at the center of strong tropical cyclones/Hurricanes

Music 
 Eye of the Hurricane (Impellitteri album), 1997
 Eye of the Hurricane (The Alarm album), 1987
 Eye of a Hurricane (John Anderson album), 1984
 "Eye of a Hurricane" (song), the title track from the 1984 album by John Anderson
 Eye of a Hurricane (The Flying Burrito Brothers album), 1994, or the title track
 Eye of the Hurricane, a 2012 album by Dutch singer Ilse DeLange
 "Eye of the Hurricane", a jazz standard by Herbie Hancock first recorded on the 1965 album Maiden Voyage
 "Eye of a Hurricane", a 2011 song by Me in Motion

Written works 
 The Eye of the Hurricane, a novel by Reid Buckley
 From the Eye of the Hurricane: My Story, a 2007 autobiography of professional wrestler Alex Higgins
 Eye of a Hurricane, a novel by Ruthann Robson

Other uses 
 Eye of the Hurricane, a finishing move by professional wrestler Gregory Helms

See also
Eye of the Storm (disambiguation)